Francis Paul Veber (born 28 July 1937) is a French film director, screenwriter and producer, and playwright. He has written and directed both French and American films. Nine French-language films with which he has been involved, as either writer or director or both, have been remade as English-language Hollywood films: Le grand blond avec une chaussure noire (as The Man with One Red Shoe), L'emmerdeur (as Buddy Buddy), La Cage aux Folles (as The Birdcage), Le Jouet (as The Toy), Les Compères (as Fathers' Day), La chèvre (as Pure Luck), Les Fugitifs (as Three Fugitives), Le dîner de cons (as Dinner for Schmucks) and La Doublure  (as The Valet). He also wrote the screenplay for My Father the Hero, the 1994 American remake of the French-language film Mon père, ce héros.

Some of his screenplays started as theater plays (for instance, Le dîner de cons). This theatrical experience contributes to his films' tight structure, resulting in what has been called "marvels of economy".

Many of his French comedies feature recurring types of characters, named François Pignon (a bungler) and François Perrin (a bully).

Biography

Veber was born in Neuilly-sur-Seine, Hauts-de-Seine, the son of a writer mother and Pierre-Gilles Veber, a screenwriter. Veber's father was Jewish and his mother was Armenian-Russian (Veber was baptized at birth). His grand-uncle was writer Tristan Bernard.

His parents were both authors: his father writer and journalist Pierre-Gilles Véber and his mother novelist Catherine Agadjanian, who wrote under the name Georgette Paul (1901-1990). He is the great-nephew of playwright, novelist, journalist and lawyer Tristan Bernard, grandson of playwright Pierre Véber and nephew of screenwriter, director and hit songwriter Serge Veber. He is the uncle of Sophie Audouin-Mamikonian, young adult author of the Tara Duncan series. His son, Jean Véber, is also a screenwriter.

Filmography

As director
1976 : Le Jouet (The Toy), starring Pierre Richard, Michel Bouquet, Fabrice Greco
1981 : La Chèvre (Knock on Wood), starring Pierre Richard, Gérard Depardieu
1983 : Les Compères (ComDads), starring Pierre Richard, Gérard Depardieu
1986 : Les Fugitifs, starring Pierre Richard, Gérard Depardieu
1989 : Three Fugitives, starring Nick Nolte, Martin Short
1992 : Out on a Limb, starring Matthew Broderick, Jeffrey Jones
1996 : Le Jaguar, starring Jean Reno, Patrick Bruel
1998 : Le Dîner de Cons (The Dinner Game), starring Thierry Lhermitte, Jacques Villeret
2000 : Le placard (The Closet), starring Daniel Auteuil, Gérard Depardieu
2003 : Tais-toi !, starring Jean Reno, Gérard Depardieu
2006 : La Doublure (The Valet), starring Gad Elmaleh, Alice Taglioni, Daniel Auteuil, Dany Boon, Virginie Ledoyen, Kristin Scott Thomas
2008 : L'emmerdeur (A Pain in the Ass), starring Richard Berry, Patrick Timsit, Virginie Ledoyen

As screenwriter
1969 : Appelez-moi Mathilde, directed by Pierre Mondy
1972 : , directed by Georges Lautner
1972 : Le grand blond avec une chaussure noire, directed by Yves Robert
1973 : , directed by Georges Lautner
1973 : L'Emmerdeur, directed by Édouard Molinaro
1973 : Le Magnifique, directed by Philippe de Broca
1974 : Peur sur la ville, directed by Henri Verneuil
1974 : Le retour du grand blond, directed by Yves Robert
1975 : , directed by Édouard Molinaro
1975 : Adieu poulet, directed by Pierre Granier-Deferre
1976 : On aura tout vu, directed by Georges Lautner
1976 : Le Jouet
1978 : La Cage aux Folles, directed by Édouard Molinaro
1979 : Cause toujours... tu m'intéresses, directed by Édouard Molinaro
1979 : Coup de tête, directed by Jean-Jacques Annaud
1980 : La cage aux folles II, directed by Édouard Molinaro
1980 : Sunday Lovers / Les séducteurs, directed by Bryan Forbes, Gene Wilder, Dino Risi and Édouard Molinaro
1981 : Buddy Buddy, directed by Billy Wilder
1981 : La Chèvre
1982 : Partners, directed by James Burrows
1982 : The Toy, directed by Richard Donner
1983 : Les Compères
1985 : The Man with One Red Shoe, directed by Stan Dragoti
1985 : Hold-Up, directed by Alexandre Arcady
1986 : Les Fugitifs
1989 : Three Fugitives
1991 : Pure Luck, directed by Nadia Tass
1994 : My Father the Hero, directed by Steve Miner
1995 : , directed by Gérard Oury
1996 : The Birdcage, directed by Mike Nichols
1996 : Le Jaguar
1997 : Fathers' Day, directed by Ivan Reitman
1997 : Le Dîner de Cons
2000 : Le placard
2002 : Tais-toi !
2006 : La doublure
2008 : L'emmerdeur

As producer
1982 : Partners, directed by James Burrows
1989 : Three Fugitives
1991 : Pure Luck, directed by Nadia Tass
1997 : Fathers' Day, directed by Ivan Reitman
2006 : The Valet
2010 : Dinner for Schmucks

Honors 
 He was made Chevalier (Knight) of the Légion d'honneur on 21 September 1996, and promoted to Officier (Officer) in 2008.
 He was made Chevalier (Knight) of the Ordre national du Mérite in 2001.

References

External links
 
 

1937 births
Living people
Knights of the Ordre national du Mérite
French people of Armenian descent
French people of Jewish descent
French film directors
French male screenwriters
French screenwriters
Officiers of the Légion d'honneur
People from Neuilly-sur-Seine